Jean-Pierre Abel-Rémusat (5 September 1788 – 2 June 1832) was a French sinologist best known as the first Chair of Sinology at the Collège de France. Rémusat studied medicine as a young man, but his discovery of a Chinese herbal treatise enamored him with the Chinese language, and he spent five years teaching himself to read it. After publishing several well-received articles on Chinese topics, a chair in Chinese was created at the Collège de France in 1814 and Rémusat was placed in it.

Life
Rémusat was born in Paris on 5 September 1788 and was educated for the medical profession, earning a doctorate in medicine in 1813. While studying medicine, Rémusat discovered a Chinese herbal treatise in the collection of the Abbé Tersan and was immediately fascinated by it. He taught himself to read it by tirelessly studying the traditional Chinese dictionary Zhengzitong. In 1811, at the end of five years of study, he produced the work Essai sur la langue et la littérature chinoises (Essay on Chinese language and literature), and a paper on foreign languages among the Chinese, which procured him the patronage of Silvestre de Sacy. In 1813, Rémusat published an essay in Latin on the nature of Chinese characters and Classical Chinese entitled "Utrum Lingua Sinica sit vere monosyllabica? Disputatio philologica, in qua de Grammatica Sinica obiter agiture; autore Abelo de Remusat".

Rémusat's early publications established his reputation in the academic community, and on November 29, 1814, a chair in Chinese was created for him at the Collège de France. This date, or, alternatively, the date of his inaugural lecture (January 16, 1815), has been termed "the birth-year of [academic] sinology." Rémusat's course in Chinese at the Collège de France focused on lectures on grammar and the study of classical texts such as the Hallowed Documents (Shàngshū), the Laozi (Dao De Jing), the Nestorian Stele, and both Chinese and Manchu editions of the accounts of the life of Confucius. His lecture notes were eventually edited into book form, modeled on Joseph de Prémare's earlier grammar, and published in 1822 as Élémens de la grammaire chinoise, ou Principes généraux du Kou-wen ou style antique, et du Kouan-hou, c'est-à-dire, de la language commune généralement usitée dans l'empire chinois (Elements of Chinese Grammar, or General Principles of Gǔwén or Ancient Style, and of Guānhuà, that is to say, the Common Language Generally Used in the Chinese Empire). This work was the first scientific exposition of the Chinese language in Europe, and was later praised by Henri Maspero as "the first [work] in which the grammar was isolated to take account of the proper spirit of the Chinese language, and not just as a translation exercise where all the grammatical forms of the European languages [...] imposed their individual patterns."

Rémusat became an editor of the Journal des savants in 1818. Amid other misunderstanding of his sources, his self-assured misreading of the Japanese mujintō ("desert island[s]") in an 1817 article for the journal was responsible for the name of the Bonin Islands. He was the founder and first secretary of the Société asiatique at Paris in 1822; he also held various Government appointments.

In 1826, Rémusat published Iu-kiao-li, ou les deux cousines, roman chinois (Yu Jiao Li, titled in English as Iu-kiao-li: or, the Two Fair Cousins), one of the first Chinese novels known in Europe (the Chinese original is a minor work, though). It was read by Thomas Carlyle, Ralph Waldo Emerson, Goethe and Stendhal. A list of his works is given in Quérard's France littéraire s.v. Rémusat. His letters to Wilhelm von Humboldt are also of interest. In 1829, he was elected as a member to the American Philosophical Society.

Around 1830 Rémusat was commissioned to inventory the Chinese items held in the French Royal Library, which inspired him to begin a translation of the bibliographical sections of the Wenxian tongkao to assist European scholars in studying Chinese scholarship. He completed the first volume, "Classics", in 1832, but contracted cholera and died before it was printed. Rémusat is buried along with his wife Jenny Lecamus – the daughter of Jean Lecamus, a former mayor of Paris – near the church of St. Fargeau in Saint-Fargeau-Ponthierry, Seine-et-Marne.

Selected works 
 .
 .
 .
 .
 .
 .
 .
 .
 , Vol. I and II.
 , Vol. I, II, III, and IV, from the novel by Zhang Yun during the early Qing dynasty.
 , Vol. I and II.
 .
 , Pt. I, II. Histoire du Tibet [History of Tibet], and III. Histoire des Mongols [History of the Mongols].
 , completed and expanded by Julius Klaproth and E.A.X.C. de Landresse.
 .
 , organized by a Institut de France committee composed of C.B. Hase, J.B.F. Lajard, and Eugène Burnouf.
 {{citation |last=Abel-Rémusat |first=Jean-Pierre |author-link=Jean-Pierre Abel-Rémusat |display-authors=0 |ref= |date=1999 |author2-first=Friedrich Wilhelm Christian Karl Ferdinand |author2-last=Von Humboldt |author2-link=Wilhelm von Humboldt |title=Lettres Édifiantes et Curieuses sur la Langue Chinoise: Un Débat Philosopho-Grammatical entre Wilhelm von Humboldt et Jean-Pierre Abel-Rémusat (1821–1831)... [Edifying and Curious Letters on the Chinese Language: A Philosophico-Grammatical Debate between Wilhelm von Humboldt and Jean-Pierre Abel-Rémusat (1821–1831)] |editor-last=Rousseau |editor-first=Jean |editor2-last=Thouard |editor2-first=Denis |series=Problématiques Philosophiques |publisher=Presses Universitaires du Septentrion |location=Villeneuve-d'Ascq }}, a scholarly collection of his correspondence with Wilhelm von Humboldt edited by Jean Rousseau and Denis Thouard.

Much of the bibliography above has been drawn from Schlagintweit.

In addition, Rémusat's practical and scholarly contributions in bringing the Dutch Japanologist Isaac Titsingh's unfinished manuscripts to posthumous publication deserve acknowledgment. These works include Nihon Ōdai Ichiran ("Table of the rulers of Japan"), and also:
 Rémusat, A., éditeur. Mémoires et Anecdotes sur la Dynastie régnante des Djogouns, Souverains du Japon, avec la description des fêtes et cérémonies observées aux différentes époques de l'année à la Cour de ces Princes, et un appendice contenant des détails sur la poésie des Japonais, leur manière de diviser l'année, etc.; Ouvrage orné de Planches gravées et coloriées, tiré des Originaux Japonais par M. Isaac Titsingh; publié avec des Notes et Eclaircissemens Par M. Abel Rémusat.'' Paris (Nepveu), 1820.

See also
 Xiongnu

References
Footnotes

Works cited

Attribution

External links

Academic staff of the Collège de France
Members of the Académie des Inscriptions et Belles-Lettres
French sinologists
Members of the Société Asiatique
Linguists from France
1788 births
1832 deaths
Institut national des langues et civilisations orientales alumni